Elvis Okello Bwomono (born 29 November 1998) is an Ugandan professional footballer who plays as a full-back for ÍBV.

Club career

Youth and Southend United
Bwomono was born in Uganda and lived there until the age of three. Bwomomo later moved to London where he attended Hatch End High School. He started his career as a youth player at Queens Park Rangers, and he later joined Southend United as a 14-year old.

He made his debut for Southend in a 2–1 defeat to Gillingham in the 2017–18 EFL Trophy Southern Section Group B fixture on 29 August 2017. In October 2017, he signed his first professional contract with the club.

Following relegation, Bwomono rejected a new contract and refused to play for the club, despite playing his own part in the club’s relegation. He subsequently left Southend United.

ÍBV
In May 2022, Bwomono joined Icelandic Besta-deild karla side ÍBV.

International career
Bwomono made his international debut for Uganda in November 2020 against South Sudan.

Career statistics

Club

International

References

External links

Southend United profile

1998 births
Living people
Ugandan footballers
Uganda international footballers
English footballers
Ugandan emigrants to the United Kingdom
Association football defenders
English Football League players
Queens Park Rangers F.C. players
Southend United F.C. players
Íþróttabandalag Vestmannaeyja players
Úrvalsdeild karla (football) players
Expatriate footballers in Iceland
Ugandan expatriate sportspeople in Iceland
Ugandan expatriate footballers